Seomyeon Station is a station on the Busan Metro Line 1 and Line 2 located in Bujeon-dong, Busanjin District, Busan.

The station is connected underground to the main Busan branch of Lotte Department Store, Judies Taehwa,  Daehyun Primall, and the Seomyeon Underground Shopping Center.

Between 2010 and 2014, Seomyeon station recorded 28 platform-train gap related accidents—the second highest number of such incidents in South Korea behind Dongdaemun History & Culture Park Station in Seoul, and the highest in Busan.

Station Layout

Line 1

Line 2

See also 
 Seomyeon, Busan

Gallery

References

External links 
 Cyber station information, Line 1 from Busan Transportation Corporation 
 Cyber station information, Line 2 from Busan Transportation Corporation 

Busan Metro stations
Busanjin District
Railway stations in South Korea opened in 1985